"Please Come Home for Christmas" is a Christmas song, written in 1960 and released the same year by American blues singer and pianist Charles Brown. Hitting the Billboard Hot 100 chart in December 1961, the tune, which Brown co-wrote with Gene Redd, peaked at position number 76. It appeared on the Christmas Singles chart for nine seasons, hitting number 1 in 1972. It includes a number of characteristics of Christmas music, such as multiple references in the lyrics to the Christmas season and Christmas traditions, and the use of a church bell type sound, created using tubular bells, at the start of the song. It is sometimes referred to by its incipit, "Bells Will Be Ringing". The song has been covered by many artists, including in 1978 by the Eagles.

Personnel

 Charles Brown – vocals, piano

Eagles version

In 1978, the rock band Eagles covered and released the song as a holiday single. Their version peaked at number 18 on the U.S. Billboard Hot 100, the first Christmas song to reach the Top 20 on that chart since Roy Orbison's "Pretty Paper" in 1963. This was the first Eagles song to feature Timothy B. Schmit on bass (having replaced founding member Randy Meisner the previous year). The lineup features Don Henley (drums/lead vocals), Glenn Frey (piano, backing vocals), Joe Walsh (guitar, backing vocals), Schmit (bass/backing vocals), and Don Felder (lead guitar). Originally released as a vinyl 7" single, it was re-released as a CD single in 1995, reaching number 15 on the Billboard Adult Contemporary chart. This version includes the lyrics "bells will be ringing the sad, sad news" (that is, a Christmas alone) as opposed to Brown's original version which references the "glad, glad news" (that is, Christmas in general). 

A live version of the song was included on the compilation 4-CD box set called Selected Works: 1972–1999 released in 2000. This particular version was recorded in concert on 12/31/1999 in Los Angeles.

Forty-two years after it first charted, the Eagles' 1978 recording of "Please Come Home for Christmas" re-entered the Billboard Hot 100 chart at No. 45 (on the chart dated January 2, 2021).

Jon Bon Jovi/Bon Jovi version

Jon Bon Jovi also covered the song on the 1992 holiday album A Very Special Christmas 2 in the style of the Eagles. In 1994 the same recording was released as a charity single in Europe, but this time instead of being credited as a solo recording by Jon Bon Jovi it was released under the band name Bon Jovi. A promo music video that featured supermodel Cindy Crawford was made to accompany that release. The 1994 single release reached the top 10 in the United Kingdom, Ireland, and Italy. Don Felder of the Eagles also featured on guitar in this version of the song.

Charts

Charles Brown

Eagles

Bon Jovi

Gary Allan

Lee Roy Parnell

Willie Nelson

Josh Gracin

Martina McBride

Kelly Clarkson

George Ezra

Certifications and sales

Eagles

Jon Bon Jovi

Notes

References

1960 singles
1978 singles
1994 singles
Eagles (band) songs
American Christmas songs
Aaron Neville songs
Jon Bon Jovi songs
Charles Brown (musician) songs
Kimberley Locke songs
Josh Gracin songs
Gary Allan songs
Willie Nelson songs
Southside Johnny & The Asbury Jukes songs
Music videos directed by Herb Ritts
Asylum Records singles
Mercury Records singles
Song recordings produced by Bill Szymczyk
1960 songs
King Records (United States) singles
Song recordings produced by Jimmy Iovine